The Washington Daily News was an afternoon tabloid-size newspaper serving the Washington, D.C., metropolitan area.

History
The Washington Daily News was owned by the E. W. Scripps Company. The newspaper was born on November 8, 1921, and competed with four established local daily newspapers, the Washington Post, the Washington Times (not to be confused with the current Washington Times), the Washington Herald, and the Washington Star (The Evening Star). The newspaper's masthead had "The News" printed in large, bold letters, with "Washington Daily" printed in small letters between them, over a rendering of the U.S. Capitol dome. 

One of its last stories was a leak, likely by the "Deep Throat" whistleblower Mark Felt, that E. Howard Hunt's safe contained a map of the Watergate complex. However, the newspaper closed before the Watergate scandal received national attention and Felt delivered the rest of his information to the rival Washington Post.

On July 12, 1972, "certain assets" of The Washington Daily News were purchased by and merged with the competing Washington Star. The newspaper was soon renamed the Washington Star News. By the late 1970s the word "News" completely disappeared from the title. During the 1960s and early 1970s, their offices were located across the street from DCFD Engine Company 16, which was the odd side of the 1000 block of 13th St. Northwest.

Personalities
The Washington Daily News was the home newspaper for Ernie Pyle, the famed war correspondent.  People who gained recognition while working at the Daily News include Judy Mann, who was part of an early Vietnam War protest sit-in at Columbia University. Others who gained recognition from the News included Bill Beall, who won a Pulitzer for "Faith and Confidence", a photo of a child and a police officer; and Samuel A. Stafford - Heywood Broun Award winner (and Pulitzer runner-up for investigative reporting) famous for stories that unmasked the Surplus Food program abuses which led to the modern SNAP and WIC programs; horse racing analyst Andrew Beyer, and Inter-American Press Association (IAPA) President as well as Columbia University Maria Moors Cabot gold medal Winner John Thomas O'Rourke.

The paper was the favored newspaper of the majority African American population in Washington D.C. at a time when this market for newspapers was secondary. When it finally closed its doors in 1972, the huge letters outside the printing presses and offices were removed and given to the reporters and others as keepsakes, some of which were turned into coffee tables.

See also
 List of newspapers in Washington, D.C.

References

Newspapers published in Washington, D.C.
Defunct newspapers published in Washington, D.C.
Newspapers established in 1921
1921 establishments in Washington, D.C.